A free elections law, also known as a free and equal elections clause, is a section in many U.S. state constitutions which mandates that elections of public officials shall be free and not influence by other powers. Most such laws were placed into state constitutions in the late 18th and early 19th century.

Free elections laws

Role in anti-gerrymandering litigation and measures 
On February 4, 2022, the North Carolina Supreme Court ruled 4-3 against both congressional and legislative maps drawn by the North Carolina General Assembly's Republican majority on the grounds of the maps violating the free elections clause.

In addition, as of 2020, the state constitutions of California, Washington, Montana, Idaho, Arizona, Colorado and Virginia all provide for both free elections mandates and for redistricting commissions to redraw congressional, legislative and additional districts.

References 

Constitutional law
States of the United States law-related lists